Star Rank Boxing II is a sports video game published by Activision in 1988.

Gameplay
Star Rank Boxing II is a game in which the player creates a boxer using random statistics and chose his training regimen.

Reception
David M. Wilson and Johnny L. Wilson reviewed the game for Computer Gaming World, and stated that "All of this happens with such speed and facility that the fight takes on all the intensity of a real bout for the player(s)."

References

External links
Review in Ahoy!
Review in RUN magazine
Review in Commodore Magazine
Review in Zzap! (Italian edition)

1988 video games
Activision games
Apple II games
Boxing video games
Commodore 64 games
DOS games
Video game sequels
Video games developed in the United States
Video games set in the United States